Tonbridge Juddians Rugby Football Club is an English rugby union team based in Tonbridge in Kent. The club runs four senior teams, a ladies side and the full range of junior teams. The first XV  play in National League 2 East for the 2022–23 season having been relegated from National League 1, the previous season.

History
Tonbridge RFC was formed in 1904 and Old Juddians was formed in 1928. 'Old Juddians' were former pupils of The Judd School in Tonbridge.

The two clubs merged to form Tonbridge Juddians in 1999. The merged club began life in London 2 South, the same level at which Old Juddians was placed in when the league system was founded in 1987. The club suffered two further relegations before turning semi-professional and beginning a rapid climb up the pyramid, including a hat-trick of promotions, with the club joining the national leagues in 2011.

Honours
 London 2 South East champions: 1990–91, 2009–10
 Kent 2 champions: 1990–91
 Kent 3 champions: 1995–96
 London Division 4 South East champions: 2008–09
 London Division 1 South champions: 2010–11
 Kent Plate winners: 2012
 Kent Cup winners (2): 2015, 2017
 National League 3 London & SE champions: 2016–17

Current standings

Notes

References

External links
 Official club website

English rugby union teams
Rugby clubs established in 1904
Rugby clubs established in 1928
Rugby clubs established in 1999
Rugby union in Kent
Tonbridge
1999 establishments in England